Olga Reshetkova (born January 29, 1982) is a Kyrgyzstani cross-country skier who has competed since 2002. She finished 54th in the individual sprint event at the 2010 Winter Olympics in Vancouver.

Reshetkova's best finish at the FIS Nordic World Ski Championships was 15th in the team sprint event at Liberec in 2009 was 43rd in a 15 km event at Val di Fiemme six years earlier.

Her best overall finish was 11th in a 5 km race in the Czech Republic in 2009.

Cross-country skiing results
All results are sourced from the International Ski Federation (FIS).

Olympic Games

World Championships

References

External links
 

1982 births
Cross-country skiers at the 2010 Winter Olympics
Kyrgyzstani female cross-country skiers
Living people
Sportspeople from Bishkek
Kyrgyzstani people of Russian descent
Olympic cross-country skiers of Kyrgyzstan
20th-century Kyrgyzstani women
21st-century Kyrgyzstani women